Caroll K. Bassett (1905 – March 24, 1972) was an American jockey. He was inducted into the National Museum of Racing and Hall of Fame in 1972.

He died on March 24, 1972, in Gordonsville, Virginia at age 66.

References

1905 births
1972 deaths
American jockeys
American horse trainers